Mahmoud Soliman (born 27 August 1972) is an Egyptian handball player. He competed in the men's tournament at the 1996 Summer Olympics.

References

1972 births
Living people
Egyptian male handball players
Olympic handball players of Egypt
Handball players at the 1996 Summer Olympics
Place of birth missing (living people)